Ivana Jirešová is a Czech television, film and stage actress. She was born 15 July 1977 in Písek, Czechoslovakia. She studied at the State Conservatory in Prague, in the department of Acting. She also works as editor of the magazine Harper´s Bazaar. She has a daughter, Sofie Frida Höpner-Jirešová.

Theatre

F. X. Šalda Theatre, Liberec

Čechov na Jaltě
Ondina
Smutek sluší Elektře
Kdyby tisíc klarinetů
Hello, Dolly
Libanky .... Sibylla Chase (Noël Coward play)
Veřejné oko .... Belinda

J. K. Tyl Theatre, Plzeň
My Fair Lady .... Liza Doolittle

Ta Fantastika Theatre, Prague
Excalibur .... Morgana

Kalich Theatre, Prague
Jack the Ripper ....
Splašené nůžky ....

Filmography
"Ordinace v růžové zahradě" (2005) TV series .... Lucie Hrušková (2005-2009)
"Přízraky mezí námi" (2001) TV series .... ???

References

External links
Ivana in Palace Theatre (In Czech)
Ivana in Osobnosti

1977 births
Living people
Czech television actresses
Czech stage actresses
People from Písek
21st-century Czech actresses